Nassarius roissyi is a species of sea snail, a marine gastropod mollusk in the family Nassariidae, the Nassa mud snails or dog whelks.

Description
The length of the shell attains 15.1 mm.

The shell is elongated and subturreted. The long spire is pointed. It is formed of eight or nine convex whorls, chequered by longitudinal folds, and pretty numerous and very regular transverse striae. The body whorl is short and subglobular. The small aperture is ovate, oblong, and white in all its parts. The outer lip is finely striated internally. The columella is cylindrical, obliquely truncated, and terminated at the base by a deep emargination, which is recurved towards the back of the shell. The coloring is a little remarkable: it is of a uniform, pale, fawn-color, but interrupted on the body whorl by an obscure and transverse whitish zone.

Distribution
This species occurs in the Indian Ocean.

References

External links
 Deshayes, G. P. (1832-1833). Mollusques. In: Bélanger, C. (ed.) Voyage aux Indes-Orientales, par le nord de l'Europe, les provinces du Caucase, la Géorgie, l'Arménie et la Perse, suivi de détails topographiques, statistiques et autres sur le Pégou, les îles de Java, de Maurice et de Bourbon, sur le Cap-de-Bonne-Espérance et Sainte-Hélène, pendant les années 1825, 1826, 1827, 1828 et 1829. Volume 2, Zoologie. pp. 403-440, 3 pls. [403-416 (1 Dec. 1832); 417-440 (31 Aug. 1833); 3 pls (1833 or 1834). Paris: Arthus Bertrand
 Cernohorsky W. O. (1984). Systematics of the family Nassariidae (Mollusca: Gastropoda). Bulletin of the Auckland Institute and Museum 14: 1–356
 

Nassariidae
Gastropods described in 1832